The 2016 Thailand Open Grand Prix Gold will be the 14th grand prix's badminton tournament of the 2016 BWF Grand Prix Gold and Grand Prix. The tournament will be held at Nimibutr Stadium in Bangkok in Thailand 4–9 October 2016 and had a total purse of $120,000.

Men's singles

Seeds

  Ihsan Maulana Mustofa (first round)
  Sony Dwi Kuncoro (final)
  Hsu Jen-hao (quarterfinals)
  Boonsak Ponsana (third round)
  Tanongsak Saensomboonsuk (champion)
  Wang Tzu-wei (third round)
  Sameer Verma (first round)
  Kenta Nishimoto (semifinals)
  Takuma Ueda (second round)
  Kazumasa Sakai (third round)
  Soo Teck Zhi (second round)
  Chong Wei Feng (third round)
  Lin Yu-hsien (first round)
  Khosit Phetpradab (second round)
  Harsheel Dani (second round)
  Soong Joo Ven (first round)

Finals

Top half

Section 1

Section 2

Section 3

Section 4

Bottom half

Section 5

Section 6

Section 7

Section 8

Women's singles

Seeds

  Ratchanok Intanon (withdrew)
  Porntip Buranaprasertsuk (second round)
  Busanan Ongbamrungphan (final)
  Nitchaon Jindapon (semifinals)
  Yui Hashimoto (second round)
  Tee Jing Yi (quarterfinals)
  Liang Xiaoyu (quarterfinals)
  Kaori Imabeppu (first round)

Finals

Top half

Section 1

Section 2

Bottom half

Section 3

Section 4

Men's doubles

Seeds

  Koo Kien Keat / Tan Boon Heong (first round)
  Berry Angriawan / Rian Agung Saputro (champion)
  Bodin Issara / Nipitphon Puangpuapech (quarterfinals)
  Lee Jhe-huei / Lee Yang (quarterfinals)
  Hardianto / Kenas Adi Haryanto (second round)
  Hoon Thien How / Teo Kok Siang (quarterfinals)
  Or Chin Chung / Tang Chun Man (quarterfinals)
  Hendra Aprida Gunawan / Markis Kido (second round)

Finals

Top half

Section 1

Section 2

Bottom half

Section 3

Section 4

Women's doubles

Seeds

  Puttita Supajirakul / Sapsiree Taerattanachai (champion)
  Jongkolphan Kititharakul / Rawinda Prajongjai (semifinals)
  Chayanit Chaladchalam / Phataimas Muenwong (quarterfinals)
  Apriani Rahayu / Jauza Fadhila Sugiarto (withdrew)
  Mayu Matsumoto / Wakana Nagahara (final)
  Keshya Nurvita Hanadia / Devi Tika Permatasari (quarterfinals)
  Chow Mei Kuan / Lee Meng Yean (quarterfinals)
  Chen Szu-yu / Wu Ti-jung (quarterfinals)

Finals

Top half

Section 1

Section 2

Bottom half

Section 3

Section 4

Mixed doubles

Seeds

  Bodin Issara / Savitree Amitrapai (first round)
  Dechapol Puavaranukroh / Sapsiree Taerattanachai (semifinals)
  Tan Kian Meng / Lai Pei Jing (champion)
  Terry Hee Yong Kai / Tan Wei Han (second round)
  Yuta Watanabe / Arisa Higashino (withdrew)
  Liao Min-chun / Chen Hsiao-huan (quarterfinals)
  Alfian Eko Prasetya / Annisa Saufika (first round)
  Edi Subaktiar / Richi Puspita Dili (first round)

Finals

Top half

Section 1

Section 2

Bottom half

Section 3

Section 4

References

External links 

  SCG THAILAND OPEN 2016 at www.badmintonthai.or.th

Thailand Open
Thailand Open Grand Prix Gold
Badminton, Grand Prix Gold, Thailand Open
Badminton, Grand Prix Gold, Thailand Open
Thailand Open (badminton)
Badminton, Grand Prix Gold, Thailand Open